Keffenach is a commune in the Bas-Rhin department in Grand Est in north-eastern France.

It lies a short distance to the south of Wissembourg, within the Palatinate Forest-North Vosges Biosphere Reserve.

Population

See also
 Communes of the Bas-Rhin department

References

Communes of Bas-Rhin
Bas-Rhin communes articles needing translation from French Wikipedia